The Northland women's field hockey team are an amateur sports team based in New Zealand. The team competes annually in the Ford National Hockey League (NHL).

Northland have currently never won the Ford National Hockey League.

Team Roster
The following is the Northland team roster for the 2017 Ford NHL:

Head coaches: Nathaniel Joy

Nicola Howes (GK)
Jodie Nichol
Alana Laybourne
Sophie Morrison
Renee Ashton
Liv Crum
Stacey Michelsen
Brooke Neal
Melissa Simpson
Jess Heywood
Jess Pilmer
Jasmin McQuinn
Ella Gunson
Jade McLeod
Tyler Lench
Sarah Barnes
Ashlyn McBurnie
Hayley Maunder (GK)

References

Women's field hockey teams in New Zealand
2000 establishments in New Zealand